SheerVideo was a family of proprietary lossless video codecs developed by BitJazz Inc. to enable capture, editing, playback, and archival of professional-quality lossless video formats in real time on low-power inexpensive hardware such as laptop computers and video cameras.

SheerVideo is still available as a set of QuickTime codecs on Mac and Windows. It is also available as a set of AVI codecs on Windows as of September 2022.

History 

SheerVideo was initially developed by Andreas Wittenstein at BitJazz Inc. in July 2002.

As of September 2022, it is no longer under active development.

External links
SheerVideo page at BitJazz

Video codecs
Lossless compression algorithms